My Town, My Guy & Me is the fifth studio album by American singer Lesley Gore, released in 1965.

The album was originally titled Lesley Gore Sings for Girls in Love.

Commercial performance
My Town, My Guy & Me was much less successful than its predecessors. Only the album's title track found chart success; the single peaked at 32 on the Billboard Hot 100, after five weeks on the chart, and dropped out of the top forty after eight weeks.

Critical reception
Billboard Magazine rated the album a "package of strong pop material", with Gore's vocals on "No Matter What You Do" highlighted as "a standout" performance. Retrospectively, AllMusic awarded the album three stars, calling it Gore's "last fairly-strong non-greatest-hits LP, and the last to feature a reasonable standard of material." However, like her previous albums, it features "a number of goodies for fans inclined to dig beyond the 45s of this very singles-oriented artist."

Billboard described the title track as an "exciting rhythm number with clever lyric" and praised the "intriguing backing and powerful vocal."  Cash Box described it as a "rhythmic romantic rocker about a gal who just wants to be in the same town as the guy of her dreams."

Track listing

References

1965 albums
Lesley Gore albums